Ophiomorus is a genus of Old World skinks. The limbs are either reduced or absent, depending on the species. They are sometimes known as limbless skinks or snake skinks. Members of the genus live under rocks or in burrows.

Species
The following 12 species are recognized:
Ophiomorus blanfordii (Blanford, 1879) – Blanford's snake skink
Ophiomorus brevipes (Blanford, 1874) – short-legged snake skink 
Ophiomorus chernovi S.C. Anderson & Leviton, 1966 – Chernov's snake skink
Ophiomorus kardesi Kornilios, Kumlutaş, Lymberakis & Ilgaz, 2018
Ophiomorus latastii Boulenger, 1887 – Latast's snake skink
Ophiomorus maranjabensis Kazemi, Farhadi Qomi, Kami & S.C. Anderson, 2011 – Maranjab's snake skink
Ophiomorus nuchalis Nilson & Andrén, 1978 – Nilson's snake skink, plateau snake skink 
Ophiomorus persicus (Steindachner, 1867) – Persian snake skink
Ophiomorus punctatissimus (Bibron & Bory de Saint-Vincent, 1833) – Greek snake skink
Ophiomorus raithmai S.C. Anderson & Leviton, 1966 – eastern sand swimmer, the three-fingered sand-fish
Ophiomorus streeti S.C. Anderson & Leviton, 1966 – Street's snake skink
Ophiomorus tridactylus (Blyth, 1853) – three-toed snake skink, Indian sand-swimmer

References

Further reading
Boulenger GA (1887). Catalogue of the Lizards in the British Museum (Natural History). Second Edition. Volume III. ... Scincidæ ... London: Trustees of the British Museum. (Taylor and Francis, printers). xii + 575 pp. + Plates I-XL. (Genus Ophiomorus, p. 393).
Duméril AMC, Bibron G (1839). Erpétologie générale ou Histoire naturelle complète des Reptiles, Tome cinquième [Volume 5]. Paris: Roret. viii + 854 pp. (Ophiomorus, new genus, p. 799). (in French).
Greer AE; Wilson GDF (2001). "Comments on the scincid lizard genus Ophiomorus, with a cladistic analysis of the species". Hamadryad 26: 261–271.
Kazemi SM, Farhadi Qomi M, Kami HG, Anderson SC (2011). "A new species of Ophiomorus (Squamata: Scincidae) from Maranjab Desert, Isfahan Province, Iran, with a revised key to the genus". Amphibian and Reptile Conservation 5 (1): 23-33 (e23). (Ophiomorus maranjabensis, new species).

Ophiomorus
Lizard genera
Taxa named by André Marie Constant Duméril
Taxa named by Gabriel Bibron